This article shows all participating team squads at the 2005 Volleyball America's Cup, between August 3 and August 7 in the town of São Leopoldo, Rio Grande do Sul, Brazil.

Head coach: Fabián Armoa

Head coach: Bernardo Rezende

Head coach: Stelio de Rocco

Head coach: Roberto García

Head coach: Hugh McCutcheon

Head coach: Argimiro Méndez

References

Volleyball America's Cup squads
2005 in volleyball